New Tomorrow is the third studio album by the Serbian Irish folk/Celtic rock band Irish Stew of Sindidun, released in 2011.

The album  was released on October 6, available both on CD, released by One Records, and in a form of multimedia application, available for free download from the band's official website.

Track listing 
Lyrics and music written by Bojan Petrović.
 "From Ashes to the 7th Sky" - 2:24
 "Lady of New Tomorrow" - 3:23
 "Dream Shelf" - 2:27
 "When Day Is Over - 4:14
 "Home Is Where Your Heart Is" - 3:10
 "Take Me High" - 4:05
 "No Surrender" - 2:46
 "Prison" - 4:04
 "One Way Ticket" - 3:17
 "So in Love – 3:02
 "One for the Road" - 2:37
 "Heather" - 4:52

Personnel 
 Bojan Petrović - lead vocals, tin whistles, arranged by
 Nenad Gavrilov - acoustic guitar, backing vocals
 Ivan Ðurić - banjo, electric guitar, backing vocals
 Ana Milanović - violin
 Aleksandar Gospodinov - bass
 Marko Jovanović – drums

Guest musicians 
Nikola Stanojević – violin
Vladan Jovković – acoustic guitar
Stefan Gaćeša – electric guitar, recorded by

Additional personnel 
Marko Jovanović– producer, arranged by, recorded by, backing vocals
Vladimir Đekić – recorded by
Dušan Filimonović – recording assistant
Nemanja Filipović – audio editing
Dragana Kuprešanin – graphic design
Ciara Norton – cover art
Igor Čvoro – booklet photography
Ivan Najman - multimedia application development

References

External links
 New Tomorrow info on the band's official site

Irish Stew of Sindidun albums
2011 albums
One Records (Serbia) albums